Mthunzi Karl "Fudge" Mabeta (born 13 June 1987) is a United States-born South African rugby union footballer, currently playing with KwaZulu-Natal Moor Cup side College Rovers.

References

External links
 
 Bulls profile
 itsrugby.co.uk profile

Living people
1987 births
South African rugby union players
Bulls (rugby union) players
Blue Bulls players
Rugby union locks